Riwaq may refer to:

Riwaq (arcade) or rivaq, an arcade in Islamic architecture
Riwaq (organization), a center on the West Bank for the preservation of cultural heritage